The 2005-06 season of the Divizia A Feminin was the 16th season of Romania's premier women's football league. Two divisions (West/South) with four teams each played a double round robin. First two places in each division qualified in the Championship play-off (4 teams playing a single round-robin). Clujana won the title.

Championship play-off 
 CFF Clujana  (champion 2006–07 UEFA Women's Cup Qualifying round)
 Pandurii Lignitul Târgu Jiu
 CSS Târgovişte
 Motorul Oradea

References

Rom
Fem
Romanian Superliga (women's football) seasons